Christoph Semmler (born 3 March 1980) is a German former professional footballer who played as a goalkeeper. He works as goalkeeper coach of Fortuna Düsseldorf.

Playing career
Semmler made his professional league level debut in the 2. Bundesliga for Rot-Weiß Oberhausen on 17 August 2008 when he started a game against TuS Koblenz.

Coaching career
From the summer 2013 until the summer 2018, Semmler worked as a goalkeeper coach for Borussia Mönchengladbach II and the club's youth teams. In May 2015, Semmler held a training camp for goalkeepers in Addis Ababa, Ethiopia.

On 26 June 2018, Semmler was appointed goalkeeper coach of Belgian club K.A.S. Eupen. He left the club again at the end of the season. On 4 January 2020, he was hired goalkeeper coach of Bundesliga club Fortuna Düsseldorf.

References

1980 births
Living people
German footballers
Association football goalkeepers
2. Bundesliga players
Regionalliga players
Liga Portugal 2 players
Rot-Weiß Oberhausen players
Wuppertaler SV players
Borussia Mönchengladbach II players
Schwarz-Weiß Essen players
C.F. Os Belenenses players
German expatriate footballers
German expatriate sportspeople in Portugal
Expatriate footballers in Portugal
People from Wilhelmshaven
Footballers from Lower Saxony